Clay County is a county in the U.S. state of Tennessee. As of the 2020 census, the population was 7,581. Its county seat and only incorporated city is Celina.  Clay County is named in honor of American statesman Henry Clay, member of the United States Senate from Kentucky and United States Secretary of State in the 19th century.

History
Clay County was formed in 1870 by combining pieces from surrounding Jackson and Overton counties.  Secretary of State Cordell Hull's first law office (now a museum) was located in Clay County.

Clay County's early inhabitants farmed and worked the Cumberland River, which was the major method of transportation in the Cumberland area. There were many docks and ferry crossings throughout Clay County to transport local crops and livestock to major markets. The timber industry was a major employer throughout the 1800s and 1900s and provides many jobs today. Tobacco farming became important in the local area throughout the 1900s and many old tobacco barns are still standing. With the end of government subsidies and with foreign competition, tobacco farming is minimal.  Cattle, poultry, and corn are the major agricultural influences today. Clay County is one of the top poultry-producing counties in Tennessee.  

During the Civil War, many skirmishes took place up and down the Cumberland River to control the movement of barges laden with supplies. Local communities were split in their loyalties, with many families at odds with each other. Some of these animosities remain today between family groups.

The city of Celina is at the junction of the Obey and Cumberland rivers, and it was a major port during the steamboat years between Nashville and Burnside, Kentucky. Although the Celina ferry landing no longer exists, Celina still connects the north and south by highway. Butler's Landing was used as a storage depot with large warehouses owned and operated by the Butler family. The first Clay County Court meeting was held in a store near the river at Butler's Landing on March 6, 1871. Butler's Landing nearly became the county seat, but Celina won the vote by a narrow margin.

Clay County's rural location has restricted development and attraction of business and industry. This has resulted in the county having one of the highest unemployment rates annually in the state of Tennessee. The lack of jobs often results in the loss of educated young people who have limited opportunities locally. SR 52 has been upgraded to a 4-lane divided highway as part of the Corridor J project, which connects to I-40 in Cookeville, and work continues on developing a new industrial park within the Celina city limits. It is hoped this industrial park will help attract more jobs to the county. .

Geography
The Cumberland River flows through the center of the county from north to south, fed by the Obey River which flows through the city of Celina from its impoundment at Dale Hollow Lake, inundates much of the eastern part of the county.

Adjacent counties
Monroe County, Kentucky (north)
Cumberland County, Kentucky (northeast)
Clinton County, Kentucky (northeast)
Pickett County (east)
Overton County (southeast)
Jackson County (south)
Macon County (west)

State protected areas
Standing Stone State Forest (part)

Highways

Demographics

2020 census

As of the 2020 United States census, there were 7,581 people, 3,039 households, and 2,002 families residing in the county.

2000 census
As of the census of 2000, there were 7,976 people, 3,379 households, and 2,331 families residing in the county. The 2005 Census Estimate placed the population at 7,992  . The population density was 34 people per square mile (13/km2).  There were 3,959 housing units at an average density of 17 per square mile (6/km2).  The racial makeup of the county was 92.75% White, 1.44% Black or African American, 0.33% Native American, 0.14% Asian, 0.11% Pacific Islander, 0.24% from other races, and 4.99% from two or more races.  1.35% of the population were Hispanic or Latino of any race.

There were 3,379 households, out of which 27.70% had children under the age of 18 living with them, 54.70% were married couples living together, 9.70% had a female householder with no husband present, and 31.00% were non-families. 27.60% of all households were made up of individuals, and 12.00% had someone living alone who was 65 years of age or older.  The average household size was 2.33 and the average family size was 2.80.

In the county, the population was spread out, with 21.50% under the age of 18, 7.90% from 18 to 24, 27.40% from 25 to 44, 27.60% from 45 to 64, and 15.70% who were 65 years of age or older.  The median age was 40 years. For every 100 females there were 94.60 males.  For every 100 females age 18 and over, there were 95.00 males.

The median income for a household in the county was $23,958, and the median income for a family was $29,784. Males had a median income of $23,513 versus $16,219 for females. The per capita income for the county was $13,320.  About 14.30% of families and 19.10% of the population were below the poverty line, including 23.40% of those under age 18 and 27.60% of those age 65 or over.

Communities

City
Celina (county seat)

Unincorporated communities

 Bakerton, Tennessee
 Baptist Ridge
Free Hill
Hermitage Springs
 Midway
Moss

Pea Ridge

Ghost town
Willow Grove

Politics

Though a traditionally Democratic county like most of Middle Tennessee, Clay County has historically been more competitive compared to other counties in the region such as Stewart County, Tennessee . The county voted for GOP candidates in 1920, 1960, 1968, 1972, 1984 and 1988, and Herbert Hoover in 1928, Ronald Reagan in 1980, and George W. Bush in 2004 all came within less than 2 percentage points of winning Clay County. Like almost all of Tennessee, however, the county has turned solidly Republican in the 2010s.

See also
National Register of Historic Places listings in Clay County, Tennessee

References

External links

Clay County Chamber of Commerce
Clay County Schools
 Dale Hollow Lake tourism information
Clay County, TNGenWeb - genealogy resources 
Dale Hollow Horizon – local newspaper

 
1870 establishments in Tennessee
Populated places established in 1870
Middle Tennessee
Counties of Appalachia